Setu Bharatam was launched by Prime Minister Narendra Modi on 4 March 2016 at a budget of , with an aim to make all national highways free of railway crossings by 2019.

Project details

Setu Bharatam programme aims to make all National Highways free of railway level crossings by 2019. This is being done to prevent the frequent accidents and loss of lives at level crossings. 208 Railway Over Bridges (ROB)/Railway Under Bridges (RUB) will be built at the level crossings at a cost of 20,800 crore as part of the programme.

The details of 208 Railway Over Bridges are as follows:

 Andhra Pradesh – 33, 
 Assam – 12, 
 Bihar – 20, 
 Chhattisgarh – 5, 
 Gujarat – 8, 
 Haryana – 10, 
 Himachal Pradesh – 5, 
 Jharkhand – 11, 
 Karnataka – 17, 
 Kerala – 4, 
 Madhya Pradesh -6, 
 Maharashtra – 12, 
 Odisha – 4, 
 Punjab – 10, 
 Rajasthan – 9, 
 Tamil Nadu – 9, 
 Utarakhand – 2, 
 Uttar Pradesh – 9, 
 West Bengal – 22

The detailed Project Reports have already been received for 73 ROBs and of these 64 ROBs are expected to be sanctioned with an estimated cost of 5600 crore. More than 1500 old and worn down bridges will also be improved by replacement/widening/strengthening in a phased manner at a cost of about 30,000 crore.

The Ministry of Road Transport & Highways has also established an Indian Bridge Management System (IBMS) at the Indian Academy for Highway Engineer in Noida, U.P. The aim is to carry out conditions survey and inventorization of all bridges on National Highways in India by using Mobile Inspection Units. 11 consultancy firms have been appointed for this purpose. Inventorization of 50,000 bridges has been done. The first cycle of the survey is expected to be completed by June 2016.

External links
 Ministry of Indian Railways, Official website
Indian Railways Live Information, Official website
 Indian Railways Rolling Stock Maintenance

See also

 Similar rail development
 Future of rail transport in India, rail development

 Similar roads development
 Bharatmala
 Diamond Quadrilateral, Subsumed in Bharatmala
 Golden Quadrilateral, completed national road development connectivity older scheme
 National Highways Development Project, Subsumed in Bharatmala
 North-South and East-West Corridor, Subsumed in Bharatmala
 India-China Border Roads, Subsumed in Bharatmala
 Expressways of India

 Similar ports and river transport development
 Indian Rivers Inter-link
 List of National Waterways in India
 Sagar Mala project, national water port development connectivity scheme

 Similar air transport development
 Indian Human Spaceflight Programme
 UDAN, national airport development connectivity scheme

 Highways in India
 List of National Highways in India by highway number
 List of National Highways in India

 General
 Transport in India
 Water transport in India

References

Modi administration initiatives
Bridges in India
Proposed bridges in India
Government-owned companies of India
Proposed infrastructure in India